Ruma can refer to:

 Ruma, a town and municipality in Vojvodina, Serbia
 Ruma, Illinois, a village in Illinois, United States
 Rumā, a character of Ramayana
 23S rRNA (uracil1939-C5)-methyltransferase, an enzyme
Ruma (Book), a work of fiction published in 2018